Lost in Yonkers is a play by  Neil Simon. The play won the 1991 Pulitzer Prize for Drama.

Production
The play premiered at The Center for the Performing Arts in Winston-Salem, North Carolina, on December 31, 1990, then moved to Broadway at the Richard Rodgers Theatre on February 21, 1991, where it ran for  780 performances and 11 previews. Produced by Emanuel Azenberg and directed by Gene Saks, the cast included Jamie Marsh as Jay, Irene Worth as Grandma, Mercedes Ruehl as Bella, Kevin Spacey as Louie, Lauren Klein as Gert, Danny Gerard as Arty, and Mark Blum as Eddie.

Plot
In Brooklyn 1942, Evelyn Kurnitz has just died following a lengthy illness. Her husband, Eddie Kurnitz, needs to take a job as a traveling salesman to pay off the medical bills incurred, and decides to ask his stern and straight talking mother, from whom he is slightly estranged, if his two early-teen sons, Jay and Arty (who their Grandma insists on calling by their full given names, Jacob and Arthur, which she pronounces "Yakob" and "Artur"), can live with her and their Aunt Bella Kurnitz in Yonkers. She refuses.  After a threat by Bella, she lets them stay without ever saying they could stay. Despite their Grandma owning and operating a candy store, Jay and Arty don't like their new living situation as they're afraid of their Grandma, and find it difficult to relate to their crazy Aunt Bella, whose slow mental state is manifested by perpetual excitability and a short attention span, which outwardly comes across as a childlike demeanor. Into their collective lives returns one of Eddie and Bella's other siblings, Louie Kurnitz, a henchman for some gangsters. He is hiding out from Hollywood Harry, who wants what Louie stole and is hiding in his small black bag. Jay and Arty's mission becomes how to make money fast so that they can help their father and move back in together, which may entail stealing the $15,000 their Grandma has hidden somewhere. Bella's mission is to find a way to tell the family that she wants to marry Johnny, her equally slow movie theater usher boyfriend; the two could also use $5,000 of Grandma's hidden money to open their dream restaurant. And Louie's mission is to survive the next couple of days.

Characters

Jay: He is fifteen "and a half" years old. He insists on the "and a half". The death of his  mother forces him to be more mature than he is ready to be when his father leaves him and his younger brother with his family so he can sell scrap iron during World War Two. The play tells his coming-of-age story. 

Arty: Jay's younger brother, he is 13 "and a half" years old. More of an observer than the rest of his family, he often goes with the flow of things, but also can be a little childish.

Bella: Jay's aunt, late 30's to early 40's. She is sometimes a bit off-center and is mentally challenged, but despite this she is also loving and protective of her nephews. Much of the second half of the play focuses on her attempts at independence from her stern mother. 

Louie: Jay's flamboyant, jovial uncle, in his late 30s, who comes to live with the family when he is hiding from the local mob. He is considered by Grandma Kurnitz to be the "survivor" of the family. He has a strong, mercurial nature, and a certain underlying dark side, which the kids uncover in the second act of the play. He works as a "bag-man" for the mob. 

Grandma Kurnitz: Jay's grandmother. A very old and stern woman, an immigrant from Germany. Owing to her harsh childhood, she has always been very intolerant of what in others she calls "weaknesses". She is blunt, sometimes even in a funny way, and always knows what is going on with the people around her. 

Eddie: Jay's middle-aged father. After the death of his wife, he is forced to send his two sons to live with their grandmother, while he repays his large financial debts. He is shown to be, much like his sisters, a nervous wreck around Grandma. 

Gert: Jay's aunt, and Grandma's daughter. She is a very interesting addition to the family. Her most noticeable issue is that when she breathes she has a tendency to suck in while still speaking, as a result of trauma instilled in her by Mother, from a young age.

Film adaptation

Simon adapted his play for a 1993 feature film directed by Martha Coolidge, and starring Brad Stoll as Jay. Worth and Ruehl reprised their stage roles, and Richard Dreyfuss was cast as Louie. Bella's beau Johnny, an unseen character in the play, was portrayed by David Strathairn.

Awards and nominations
Source: Playbill Vault
Awards
 Drama Desk Award for Outstanding Actress in a Play (Mercedes Ruehl)
 Drama Desk Award for Outstanding Featured Actor in a Play (Kevin Spacey)
 Drama Desk Award for Outstanding Featured Actress in a Play (Irene Worth)
 Drama Desk Award for Outstanding Play
 Pulitzer Prize for Drama
 Tony Award for Best Actress in a Play (Mercedes Ruehl)
 Tony Award for Best Featured Actor in a Play (Kevin Spacey)
 Tony Award for Best Featured Actress in a Play (Irene Worth)
 Tony Award for Best Play

Nominations
 Tony Award for Best Direction of a Play (Gene Saks)
 Drama Desk Award for Outstanding Costume Design (Santo Loquasto)

References

External links
 
 

1991 plays
Jews and Judaism in Westchester County, New York
Plays by Neil Simon
Broadway plays
Drama Desk Award-winning plays
Pulitzer Prize for Drama-winning works
Tony Award-winning plays
American plays adapted into films
Plays set in New York (state)
Plays set in the 1940s
Yonkers, New York